Bukedde, is a daily Ugandan newspaper published in Kampala, Uganda. It is the leading daily newspaper in the country for both English and Luganda papers with an estimated daily circulation of about 33,290 copies daily.

Overview
The newspaper is published by the Vision Group, which publishes the New Vision, Uganda's leading English daily newspaper. The publisher also circulates other dailies and weeklies in Ugandan languages, including: (a) Orumuri in Runyakitara (b) Etop in Ateso and Rupiny in Lwo. Bukedde is available in print form and on the Internet.

History
The newspaper was founded in 1994. It is the only newspaper in Uganda that publishes a dedicated section about the Kabaka of Buganda. The name Bukedde, translates loosely into English as Morning Has Come.

See also
 List of newspapers in Uganda
 Media in Uganda

References

External links
  Website of Bukedde

Daily newspapers published in Uganda
Mass media in Kampala